Nolan Young is a Canadian politician, who was elected to the Nova Scotia House of Assembly in the 2021 Nova Scotia general election. He represents the riding of Shelburne as a member of the Progressive Conservative Association of Nova Scotia.

Prior to his election to the legislature, Young was a municipal councillor and deputy mayor in Shelburne.

Electoral results

References

Year of birth missing (living people)
Living people
Progressive Conservative Association of Nova Scotia MLAs
Nova Scotia municipal councillors
21st-century Canadian politicians